The margna is a ritual olive wooden staff carried by Mandaean priests. A Mandaean priest always carries his margna during baptismal (masbuta) rituals.

According to the Right Ginza, the margna (staff) of Living Water (Mia Hayya) is one of the weapons of Manda d-Hayyi.

In the Qolasta
During priestly rituals, a klila (myrtle wreath) is placed on the margna. In the Qolasta, Prayer 79 is a prayer for the klila placed on the margna.

Prayer 14 in the Qolasta is dedicated to the margna. The prayer describes the margna as being covered in radiance (ziwa) and light (nhura).

See also
Mandaean priest#Clothing
Aaron's rod
Staff of Moses
Staff of office
Sceptre
Was-sceptre
Caduceus
Rod of Asclepius

References

Mandaean religious objects
Walking sticks
Olives
Mandaic words and phrases